Lowthorpe is a village in the East Riding of Yorkshire, England.

It lies south-east of the A614 road and just north-west of the Yorkshire Coast railway line from Hull to Scarborough. Lowthorpe railway station served the village until it closed on 5 January 1970.

Lowthorpe forms part of the civil parish of Harpham.

The church dedicated to St Martin was designated a Grade II* listed building in 1966 and is now recorded in the National Heritage List for England, maintained by Historic England.

In 1823 Lowthorpe (then spelt 'Lowthorp'), was in the Wapentake of Dickering. The church and perpetual curacy was under the patronage of the St Quintin family. Population at the time was 149, with occupations including nine farmers, a linen manufacturer, a corn miller, and a rope maker. Residents included William Thomas St Quintin Esquire, of Lowthorp Hall, and a gentleman.

References

External links

Villages in the East Riding of Yorkshire